The Diocese of Châlons (Latin: Dioecesis Catalaunensis; French: Diocèse de Châlons) is a Latin Church ecclesiastical territory or diocese of the Catholic Church in Châlons-sur-Marne, France. The diocese comprises the department of Marne, excluding the arrondissement of Reims.

The Diocese of Châlons is a suffragan diocese in the ecclesiastical province of the metropolitan Archdiocese of Reims.

History

Local legends maintain that the evangelization of Châlons by St. Memmius, sent thither by St. Peter and assisted by his sister Poma, also by St. Donatian and St. Domitian, took place in the first century. These legends are not creditable, and in the revised list of the diocesan saints in the Breviary (prayer book) these legends have been suppressed.

Louis Duchesne, a prominent scholar of early Christianity in Gaul, assigns the founding of the See of Châlons to the fourth century.

The bishops of Châlons played a part in French history as Peers of France. At the coronation of the Capetian kings, the Bishop of Châlons always carried the royal ring.

Cathedral, seminary, college
The older cathedral at Châlons had been dedicated to Saint Vincent, up to the time of Charles the Bald. It had become the cathedral under Bishop Felix I, ca. 625, when the older cathedral was abandoned. In 931, and again in 963, the town of Châlons suffered serious fires. In 931 the fire was deliberately set by  King Raoul (Rudolph) in reprisal for the support given by Bishop Bovo to Count Héribert of Vermandois against the King. In 963 it was Count Héribert of Vermandois who put the city to the flames because Bishop Gebuin had supported the deposition of Héribert's son from the archbishopric of Reims. In both cases the cathedral suffered serious damage. In 1138 the cathedral was struck by lightning and mostly destroyed.

The new Cathedral of S. Étienne was consecrated in 1147 by the exiled Pope Eugene III, assisted by eighteen cardinals, with Bernard of Clairvaux in attendance. In 1253, when he was visiting Rome, Bishop  Pierre de Hans was able to obtain what was claimed to be a fragment of the head of S. Étienne (Stephen the Protomartyr) from the Abbot of the monastery at S. Paolo fuori le mura.

The first seminary in Châlons was founded by Bishop Jérome de Burges (or Jérôme Bourgeois) on 14 October 1572, in part of the abandoned Hôpital Saint Lazare, which was thereafter called the Collège S. Lazare. From 1617, the seminarists shared quarters with the Jesuits, and when the Jesuits moved to larger quarters, the seminary followed them. It was only in 1646 that Bishop de Vialar provided them with separate, and inadequate, quarters. Bishop de Clermont-Tonnerre had the church of S. Nicholas demolished and the seminary extended on its foundations.

The Collège de Châlons (Collège S. Lazare) was endowed by Bishop Cosme Clausse on 30 May 1615, and he and the City entered into a contract with the Jesuits to staff the college on 23 February 1617. The Jesuits directed the school until they were expelled from France in 1762, at which point the collège was turned over to laymen and secular clergy until the end of the monarchy in 1791. In 1784 some 245 pupils were being educated there.

Benefices
The diocese was well supplied with positions which carried income with them. The cathedral had eight dignities: the Dean, the Cantor, the Grand Archdeacon (of Châlons), the Archdeacon of Joinville, the Archdeacon of Astenai, and the Archdeacon of Vertus, the Treasurer, and the Succentor. In addition there were thirty Canons. In 1699 the number of Canons was thirty-nine, while in 1764 the number was thirty-one. There had once been a Provost as well, but the office was abolished by Bishop Roger in 1065, with royal consent. The bishop appointed the four Archdeacons and the Treasurer, while the Dean, the Cantor, and the Succentor were elected by the Chapter of the Cathedral. The Chapter also assigned the prebends, to which the Archdeacons and Treasurer were not entitled.

There were also two Collegiate Churches in the city of Châlons, Saint-Trinité (with ten prebendaries, appointed by the Cathedral Chapter) and Nôtre Dame en Vaux (with twelve prebendaries, appointed by the Cathedral Chapter). Among its abbeys, the diocese counted: St. Memmius (Augustinians), founded in the fifth century by Alpinus; Toussaints (Augustinians), founded in the eleventh century; Châtrices (Augustinians); Montier-en-Der (Benedictines), founded in the seventh century by St. Bereharius, a monk from Luxeuil; Saint Urbain, founded in 865; Saint-Pierre au Mont (Benedictines), founded during the same period; Moiremont (Benedictines); Huiron (Benedictines); Saint-Sauveur-de Vertus (Benedictines); Nôtre-Dame de Vertus (Augustinians); Trois-Fontaines (Cistercians); Haute-Fontaine (Cistercians); Cheminon (Cistercians); and Moutier-en-Argonne (Cistercians). The king was the patron and made the appointments at Toussaints, Saint-Pierre, Saint-Memmius, and Châtrices. Nôtre-Dame de l'Epine, near Châlons, was a place of pilgrimage as early as the beginning of the fifteenth century, thanks to the mysterious discovery of a miraculous image of the Virgin Mary.

Revolution

In 1790 the National Constituent Assembly decided to bring the French church under the control of the State. Civil government of the provinces was to be reorganized into new units called 'départements', originally intended to be 83 or 84 in number. The dioceses of the Roman Catholic Church were to be reduced in number, to coincide as much as possible with the new departments. Since there were more than 130 bishoprics at the time of the Revolution, more than fifty dioceses needed to be suppressed and their territories consolidated. Clergy would need to take an oath of allegiance to the State and its Constitution, specified by the Civil Constitution of the Clergy, and they would become salaried officials of the State. Both bishops and priests would be elected by special 'electors' in each department. This meant schism, since bishops would no longer need to be approved (preconised) by the Papacy; the transfer of bishops, likewise, which had formerly been the exclusive prerogative of the pope in canon law, would be the privilege of the State; the election of bishops no longer lay with the Cathedral Chapters (which were all abolished), or other responsible clergy, or the Pope, but with electors who did not even have to be Catholics or Christians.

The diocese of Châlons-sur-Marne was one of the dioceses which was suppressed, and its territory was transferred to a new diocese centered at Reims, and called the 'Diocese of the Marne'. The bishop of Marne would be the Metropolitan of a 'Metropole du Nord-Est', which would include: Marne, Aisne, Ardennes, Meurthe, Moselle, and Nord. The dioceses of Soissons and Troyes were also suppressed and incorporated into the 'Diocèse du Marne'. The Bishops of Reims, Châlons, Soissons and Troyes protested, addressing letters to their clergy and to the 'electors' and warning them to take no account of the activities of the government as regards the Church. In Châlons a large number of the clergy were in favor of reforms. One in four of the curates, and one in five of the vicars, refused to take the oath to the Civil Constitution (or retracted it after they had taken it). This meant that they were discharged from their functions and left without incomes; they became targets of the more radical of the revolutionaries.

In Marne, the 539 electors were invited to assemble by the Constituent Assembly, and 395 of them assembled at Reims in March 1791. They elected Fr. Gangand, the curé of Mareuil-sur-Ay, but he refused. Then, on March 15, they elected Nicolas Diot as Bishop and Metropolitan of Marne, and he thus acquired control over the suppressed diocese of Châlons-sur-Marne. He was consecrated in Paris on 1 May 1791 by Constitutional Bishop Jean-Baptiste Gobel. The consecration was valid, having been performed in the proper form by three Roman Catholic bishops, but illicit and schismatic, since the election and consecration had taken place without the sanction of Pope Pius VII. Diot acquiesced in new attitudes; he actually presided at the marriage of one of his priests. He survived the Terror (which had abolished Religion and replaced it with Reason), and as late as 1800 he carried out an episcopal consecration (Cambrai) In 1801 he presided at a diocesan synod, and in June 1802 at a Metropolitan synod. He died on 31 December 1802.

Church of the Concordat

In the meantime First Consul Napoleon Bonaparte was preparing to end the religious confusion in France by entering into a Concordat with the Vatican. He had plans for the future, and he required a united France in order to carry them out successfully. In separate actions both he and Pius VII called on all bishops in France to submit their resignations. On November 29, 1801, by the bull Qui Christi Domini, Pope Pius VII suppressed all of the Roman Catholic dioceses in France, and reinstituted them under papal authority. This act did away with whatever doubt or ambiguity might still exist as to a 'Constitutional Church' and 'Constitutional dioceses' in France. United in 1802 with the Diocese of Meaux and in 1821 with the Archdiocese of Reims, the Diocese of Châlons was re-established in 1822, and is suffragan to the Archdiocese of Reims.

The Concordat of 1801 was unilaterally abrogated by the Law of Separation of Church and State, enacted on 9 December 1905.  From that date, the Republic no longer nominated French bishops. The law also declared that all religious buildings were property of the state and local governments, and enacted the prohibition of affixing religious signs on public buildings. Nuns were removed from hospital staffs. Schools were secularized, and religious instruction was forbidden to children between the ages of six and thirteen. The law did not apply to the provinces of Alsace or Lorraine, which were at the time part of the German Empire.

Bishops

To 1000

c. 260–280: St Memmius
St Donatianus
St Domitianus
Amable
c. 300: Didier
c. 340: Sanctissimus
c. 400: Provinctus
by 411 – before 461: Alpinus (St Alpin)
by 461 – 500: Amandinus (Amand)
500: Florandus
c. 515: Providerius
c. 530: Prodictor (or Proditor, Productor)
535–541: Lupus
Papio
c. 565: Eucharius
578: Teutinodus (or Teutmodus)
c. 579: Elasius (Elaphius)
attested 614: Leudomerus
after 614 – after 627: Felix
Ragnebaud
c. 660: Landebert
c. 685: Arnoul (I).
693: Bertoinus
Felix (II).
Bladald
Scaricus
c. 770: Ricaire
770–784: Willibald
784–804: Bovo
c. 804–827: Hildegrim of Châlons
810–835: Adelelmus
835–857: Lupus (II)
857–868: Erchenrad
868–878: Willibert
878–887: Berno
887–894: Rodoaldus
894–908: Mancio
c. 908–912: Letoldus
c. 912–947: Bovo (II).
c. 947–998: Gibuin (I).
998–1004: Gibuin (II).

1000-1300

1004–1008: Guido (Guy)
1008–1042: Roger I
1042–1066: Rotgerus Secundus<ref>The bishop signs himself as 'Rotgerus episcopus secundus'.  Barthélemy (1853), p. 98. Gallia christiana IX, pp. 873-874.</ref>
1066–1093: Roger de Hainaut
1190–1201: Rotrou du Perche
1200–1215: Gérard de Douai
1215–1226: Guillaume (II) de Perche, Count of  Le PercheSede Vacante (1226–1228)
1228–1237: Philippe de Nemours
1241–1247: Geoffroy de Grandpré
1248–1261: Pierre (I) de Hans
1262–1269: Conon de VitrySede Vacante (1269–1272)
1272–1273: Arnoul (II)
1273–1284: Rémi de Somme-Tourbe
1285–1313: Jean (I) de Châteauvillain

1300-1500

1313–1328: Pierre (II) de Latilly
1328–1335: Simon de Châteauvillain
1335–1339: Philippe (III) de Melun
1339: Jean (II) de Mandevillain
1340–1351: Jean (III) Happe
1352–1356: Regnaud Chauveau
1357–1389: Archambaud de Lautrec
1389–1413: Charles de Poitiers (Avignon Obedience)
1413–1420: Louis of Bar (Administrator)
1420–1438: Johann IV of Saarbrücken
1439: Jean (V) Tudert
1440–1453: Guillaume (III) le Tur
1453–1503: Geoffroy (III) Soreau (or Geoffroy Floreau)

1500-1700

1504–1535: Gilles de Luxembourg
1535–1549: Robert de Lenoncourt
1550–1556: Philippe de Lenoncourt
1556–1571: Jérome de Burges (or Jérôme Bourgeois)
1571–1573: Nicolas Clausse de Marchamont
1575–1624: Cosme Clausse de Marchamont
1624–1640: Henri Clausse de Fleury
1642–1680: Félix Vialar de Herse
1681–1695: Louis-Antoine de Noailles
1696–1720: Jean-Baptiste-Louis-Gaston de Noailles

1700-1900

1721–1733: Nicolas-Charles de Saulx-Tavannes
1733–1763: Claude-Antoine de Choiseul-Beaupré
[Antoine de Lastic (December 19–23, 1763)]
1764–1782: Antoine-Eléonore-Léon Le Clerc de Juigné de Neuchelles
1782–1801: Anne-Antoine-Jules de Clermont-Tonnerre
1790–1824: Diocese suppressed1824–1860: Marie-Joseph-François-Victor Monyer de Prilly
1860–1864: Jean-Honoré Bara
1864–1882: Guillaume-René Meignan (later  Bishop of Arras)
1882–1894: Guillaume-Marie-Romain Sourrieu (later  Archbishop of Rouen)
1894–1907: Gaspard-Marie-Michel-André Latty

From 1900
1908–1912: Hector-Irénée Sévin (later  Archbishop of Lyon)
1912–1948: Joseph-Marie Tissier
1948–1973: René-Joseph Piérard
1973–1998: Lucien-Emile Bardonne
1999–2015: Gilbert Louis
2015–present : François Touvet

See also
Catholic Church in France

 References 

Bibliography
Reference works
  (Use with caution; obsolete)
  (in Latin) 
 (in Latin) 
 
 
 

Studies

 (in French)

Guilbert, Sylvette (ed.) (2014): Fasti Ecclesiae Gallicanae. Répertoire prosopographique des évêques, dignitaires et chanoines des diocèses de France de 1200 à 1500. XIV. Diocèse de Châlons-en-Champagne. Turnhout, Brepols. 

External links
Goyau, Georges. "Châlons-sur-Marne." The Catholic Encyclopedia. Vol. 3. New York: Robert Appleton Company, 1908. Retrieved: 2016-07-11.
Cheney, David M.  Catholic-Hierarchy:''  Diocese of Chalons.  Retrieved: 2016-07-11 
 Centre national des Archives de l'Église de France, L’Épiscopat francais depuis 1919, retrieved: 2017-05-15.

Acknowledgment

Chalons
Chalons
Chalons
1822 establishments in France